Mount Rearguard is in the Beartooth Mountains in the U.S. state of Montana. The peak is one of the tallest in the Beartooth Mountains and is in the Absaroka-Beartooth Wilderness in Custer National Forest. A small remnant glacier lies to the east of Mount Rearguard, which sits at the western edge of the Hellroaring Plateau.

References

Rearguard
Beartooth Mountains
Mountains of Carbon County, Montana